The 2016 French Athletics Championships was the 128th edition of the national championship in outdoor track and field for France. It was held on 24–26 July at the Stade du Lac de Maine in Angers. A total of 38 events (divided evenly between the sexes) were contested over the three-day competition.

Results

Men

Women

References

Results
Les championnats de France 2016 
Results

French Athletics Championships
French Athletics Championships
French Athletics Championships
French Athletics Championships
Sport in Angers